Space Strikers (lit 20,000 Leagues in Space) is a 1995 animated television series based on the 1870 Jules Verne novel Twenty Thousand Leagues Under the Sea. Episodes center around the crew of the spaceship Nautilus, led by Captain Nemo, in an attempt to liberate Earth and other planets from the control of Master Phantom. The series later premiered in France on M6 on March 8, 1995 and later aired in the United States on UPN from September 10 to December 3, 1995. Action sequences were shown in "Strikervision" 3-D.

Ownership of the series passed to Disney in 2001 when Disney acquired Fox Kids Worldwide, which also includes Saban Entertainment. The series is not available on Disney+.

Plot
Space Strikers has a single continuous plot running through all twelve episodes. The universe is inhabited by humans and a variety of other space-faring species. They are under threat from the mostly-robotic armies of Master Phantom, a human cyborg who believes Captain Nemo left him to die. Earth and multiple other planets have already been conquered at the start of the first episode. Members of various other species join the human crew of the Nautilus to fight back, including an anthropomorphic wolf, an anthropomorphic dolphin, a Cupid-like creature, and a variety of robots.

Due to their previous friendship and shared academy training, Captain Nemo and Master Phantom attempting to outwit each other is recurrent theme in the show.

Strikervision
At various times in an episode, a small green icon appears in the corner of the screen to alert the viewer to put on 3D glasses. Early 3D sequences typically feature repeated background and foreground images moving in opposite directions over the characters or ships on screen, giving the illusion of rotation or movement. Later instances of 3-D imagery often show spaceships flying past the screen, made possible by the show's use of 3D computer graphics for many of its spacecraft.

Voice cast
Norman Blackmore
Les Doolan - Dacar
Jimmy Flinders - Captain Nemo
HF Guilford
Orville Ketchum -  Admiral Maalko
Ruth Lazar
Kellie O'Connell
Harry Pitts
Nick Scott
Reed Waxman

Uncredited
Mary Kay Bergman
Richard Epcar

Music
In addition to Ron Wasserman composing original music for this series, Shuki Levy also co-composed for this series, recycling some of the music from Starcom: The U.S. Space Force which he would later reuse for the English dub version of Season 1 of Digimon Adventure.

Episodes

Season 1

References

External links
 
  Space Strikers in Planete-Jeunesse

Television shows based on American novels
UPN original programming
1990s American animated television series
1995 American television series debuts
1995 American television series endings
1990s French animated television series
1995 French television series debuts
1995 French television series endings
American children's animated action television series
American children's animated space adventure television series
French children's animated action television series
French children's animated space adventure television series
UPN Kids
English-language television shows
Television series by Saban Entertainment
Television shows based on Twenty Thousand Leagues Under the Sea